Peter Kastner (1 October 1943 – 18 September 2008) was a Canadian-born actor who achieved prominence as a disaffected youth in movies of the 1960s.

Life and career
Kastner was born in Toronto, Ontario, the son of Rose and Martin Kastner. His family was Jewish.

Kastner's first leading role was in the 1964 Canadian film Nobody Waved Goodbye, which was a semi-improvised, documentary-style look at middle-class teenagers. He played an alienated young man, the son of a prosperous automobile dealer, who drifts into petty thievery. His breakthrough role was in the title role in Francis Ford Coppola's 1966 comedy You're a Big Boy Now, which starred Elizabeth Hartman, Geraldine Page, Rip Torn, Karen Black, and Julie Harris, in which Kastner played an earnest young man who moves from his parents' house to New York City and struggles with confusing relationships. He played a similar role as an earnest young advertising man swept up in the era in 1971's B.S. I Love You.

Kastner starred in the 1968–1969 ABC sitcom The Ugliest Girl in Town, where he played Timothy Blair, a man who dressed in drag as a favour to his photographer brother. It was following Ugliest Girl that Kastner's fortunes declined. Unable to gain leading roles, he took supporting roles in movies and television series.

He starred in the 1977 CBC Television sitcom Custard Pie as Leo Strauss, the manager of a musical group of that name, but the series was not popular or critically well received. His last film role was in Unfinished Business (1984), a sequel to Nobody Waved Goodbye. In the last year in his life he began to communicate about being a victim of incest at the hands of a family member. He also taught at Scituate High School in Scituate, Mass during the 1990–1991 school year.

Death
Kastner died from a heart attack in Toronto on 18 September 2008. He was survived by his second wife, Jenny, and his brother, filmmaker and former child actor John Kastner. He also left two sisters, Susan, a journalist, and Kathy, a CBC television host; Susan's son Jamie Kastner is a noted documentary filmmaker.

References

External links
 
 

1943 births
2008 deaths
Male actors from Toronto
Canadian male film actors
Canadian male television actors
Jewish Canadian male actors